Kevin Patrick Mills is a Canadian film director, screenwriter and actor, whose feature film debut Guidance was released in 2015.

Early life and education
A former child actor who appeared on the television series You Can't Do That on Television, Mills later studied filmmaking at Ryerson University and studied at the Canadian Film Centre.

Career
Mills has directed several short films, including 5 Dysfunctional People in a Car, Marjorie, Pat's First Kiss, Babysitting Andy, The Affected Turtleneck Trio and I'm Not Martin!, and won the Toronto International Film Festival's annual Pitch This! competition for emerging film directors in 2008 for his pitch for Don't Talk to Irene. Don't Talk to Irene later won the award for Best Comedy Screenplay at the 2013 Austin Film Festival.

Mills, who is gay, wrote Guidance as a satirical spin on his own history as a child actor, centering the screenplay on a character whose backstory is similar to his own but who has much more dysfunctional ways of dealing with his insecurities. Having not taken an acting role since 1994, he had to pay almost ten years worth of back ACTRA dues in order to act in his own film. His performance was nominated for a 2015 ACTRA Award. Guidance was reviewed as a New York Times Critics' Pick upon its release.

Don't Talk to Irene went into production in 2016 as Mills' second film, premiered at the 2017 Toronto International Film Festival and was theatrically released in Canada and the USA. It went on to win both the Comedy Vanguard Award and Audience Award at the Austin Film Festival, the Audience Choice at the Kingston Canadian Film Festival and the Galet d'Or at the 5th Canadian film festival of Dieppe, France. Mills was also listed as one of MovieMaker Magazine's 25 Screenwriters to Watch in 2018. In June 2018, Don't Talk to Irene won two Canadian Comedy Awards: Best Feature and Best Writing in a Feature.

In 2020 Mills directed the digital series Queens for CBC Gem, and was nominated for a Writers Guild of Canada Screenwriting Award for the episode “Minnie and Sharron”. Queens went on to be named Best Canadian Web Series of 2020 by Now.

In October 2020, he directed Lifetime's first LGBTQ+ Christmas movie, The Christmas Setup. The Christmas Setup was nominated for a GLAAD Media Award for Outstanding TV Movie, a Directors Guild of Canada Award for Outstanding Directorial Achievement in Movies for Television and Mini-Series, and the Canadian Screen Award for Best TV Movie at the 10th Canadian Screen Awards.

Filmography

Actor

Director

References

External links

Year of birth missing (living people)
Living people
21st-century Canadian screenwriters
21st-century Canadian male writers
Canadian television writers
Canadian male child actors
Canadian male film actors
Canadian male screenwriters
Film directors from Ottawa
Film directors from Toronto
Canadian gay actors
Canadian gay writers
Canadian LGBT screenwriters
LGBT film directors
Male actors from Ottawa
Male actors from Toronto
Writers from Ottawa
Writers from Toronto
Toronto Metropolitan University alumni
Canadian Film Centre alumni
Canadian male television writers
Canadian Comedy Award winners
Gay screenwriters
21st-century Canadian LGBT people